This list of museums is defined for this context as institutions (including nonprofit organizations, government entities, and private businesses) that collect and care for objects of cultural, artistic, scientific, or historical interest and make their collections or related exhibits available for public viewing. Museums that exist only in cyberspace (i.e., virtual museums) are not included.

For individual topics, see list of science museums, list of natural history museums, list of transport museums, and articles on art galleries, print rooms, national museums and art museums in general.

According to the Museums of the World, there are about 55,000 museums in 202 countries.

Afghanistan

Åland
 Åland Maritime Museum
 Åland Museum
 Kastelholm Castle
 Pommern (ship)

Albania

Algeria

Andorra

Angola

Antigua and Barbuda

Argentina

Armenia

Aruba

Australia

Austria

Azerbaijan

Bahamas

Bahrain
Bahrain National Museum
Beit Al Quran

Bangladesh

Barbados
Barbados Museum & Historical Society

Belarus

Belgium

Belize
Ambergris Museum
Belmopan Museum
Bliss Institute
Image Factory Art Foundation and Gallery
Maritime Museum (Belize)
Museum of Belize

Benin

Bermuda
Bermuda Maritime Museum
Masterworks Museum of Bermuda Art

Bhutan

Bolivia

Bosnia and Herzegovina

Botswana

Brazil

Brunei
Brunei Museum 
Malay Technology Museum

Bulgaria

Burkina Faso

Burundi

Cambodia
Cambodian Cultural Village
Cambodian Landmine Museum
Choeung Ek
National Museum of Cambodia
Silver Pagoda, Phnom Penh
Tuol Sleng Genocide Museum

Cameroon

Canada

Canary Islands

Cape Verde
Cape Verde Kite Museum
Museu da Tabanka

Cayman Islands
Bodden Town Mission House, Grand Cayman
Cayman Islands National Museum
Old Savannah School House

Central African Republic

Chad

Chile

China

Colombia

Comoros

Costa Rica

Croatia

Cuba

Curaçao

Cyprus

Northern Cyprus
Kyrenia Castle
Kyrenia ship

Czech Republic

Denmark

Dominica
The Dominica Museum

Dominican Republic

Alcázar de Colón
Columbus Lighthouse
Fortaleza San Felipe
Fortaleza San Luis
Museo Bellapart
Museo de las Casas Reales

Ecuador

Egypt

El Salvador

Equatorial Guinea

Eritrea

Estonia

Eswatini (Swaziland)
Ezulwini Handicrafts Centre
Indingilizi Gallery

Ethiopia

Falkland Islands

Falkland Islands Museum

Faroe Islands

Fiji
Fiji Museum

Finland

France

French Polynesia
Paul Gauguin Cultural Center
Paul Gauguin Museum (Tahiti)
Musée de Tahiti et des Îles
Robert Wan Pearl Museum

Gambia

Georgia

Germany

Ghana

Gibraltar
Gibraltar Museum

Greece

Greenland
Greenland National Museum
Nuuk Art Museum
Qaqortoq Museum
Sisimiut Museum
Upernavik Museum

Guadeloupe

Fort Napoléon des Saintes

Guam

National Museum of the Dulce Nombre de Maria
Pacific War Museum
War in the Pacific National Historical Park

Guatemala

Guernsey

Artparks Sculpture Park
Castle Cornet
Fort Grey
Fort Hommet 10.5 cm Coastal Defence Gun Casement Bunker
Sausmarez Manor

Guinea
Sandervalia National Museum
Kissidougou Ethnology Museum

Guinea-Bissau

Guyana

Haiti

Honduras

Hong Kong

Hungary

Iceland

India

Indonesia

Iran

Iraq
Kurdish Textile Museum
Ennigaldi-Nanna's museum
Mosul Museum
National Museum of Iraq
Tikrit Museum

Ireland

Isle of Man
Jurby Transport Museum
Leece Museum
Manx Aviation and Military Museum
Old House of Keys
Port Erin Railway Museum

Israel

Italy

Ivory Coast

Jamaica

Japan

Jersey

Jordan
Aqaba Archaeological Museum
The Children's Museum Jordan
Jordan Archaeological Museum
Prophet Mohammad Museum

Kazakhstan

Kenya

Kiribati
Te Umanibong

North Korea

South Korea

Kuwait

Kyrgyzstan
Burana Tower
Manas Ordo

Laos

Latvia

Lebanon

Lesotho
Morija Museum & Archives

Liberia
Liberian National Museum

Libya

Liechtenstein
Liechtenstein National Museum
Kunstmuseum Liechtenstein

Lithuania

Luxembourg

Macau

Madagascar

Malawi

Malaysia

Maldives
National museum (Maldives)

Mali

Malta

Malta Postal Museum
National Museum of Archaeology
National Museum of Fine Arts
Palazzo Falson
Saint James Cavalier
Wignacourt Museum

Mauritania

Mauritius

Mexico

Moldova

Monaco
Monaco Top Cars Collection
Monaco Naval Museum
Musée National de Monaco
Museum of Old Monaco
Museum of the Chapel of Visitation
Museum of Prehistoric Anthropology
Museum of Stamps and Coins
Napoleon Museum (Monaco)
New National Museum of Monaco
Oceanographic Museum

Mongolia

Montenegro
King Nikola's Palace
National Museum of Montenegro
Museum of Local History in Ulcinj

Morocco

Mozambique

Myanmar

Namibia

Nepal

Netherlands

New Caledonia

New Zealand

Nicaragua

Niger

Nigeria

North Macedonia

Norway

Oman

Palau

Palestinian territories
Badd Giacaman Museum
Baituna al-Talhami Museum
Gaza Museum of Archaeology

Pakistan

Panama

Papua New Guinea

Paraguay

Peru

The Philippines

Pitcairn Islands
Pitcairn Island Museum

Poland

Portugal

Puerto Rico

Qatar
Qatar Museums
Museum of Islamic Art, Doha
National Museum of Qatar
Sheikh Faisal Bin Qassim Al Thani Museum
The Al Thani Collection

Romania

Russia

Rwanda
Kandt House Museum of Natural History
Kigali Genocide Memorial Centre
National Museum of Rwanda
Rwesero Art Museum

Sahrawi Arab Democratic Republic

People's Liberation Army Museum

Saint Helena
Longwood House
Museum of Saint Helena

San Marino
Sammarinese Museum of Ancient Arms

São Tomé and Príncipe
São Sebastião Museum

Saudi Arabia

Hejaz Railway Museum
Humane Heritage Museum
Jeddah Regional Museum of Archaeology and Ethnography
Mada'in Saleh
Masmak fort
Nasseef House
National Museum of Saudi Arabia
Royal Saudi Air Force Museum
Shadda Palace

Senegal

Serbia

Seychelles

Sierra Leone

Singapore

Slovakia

Slovenia

Somalia

South Africa

South Georgia and the South Sandwich Islands
South Georgia Museum

South Sudan

Spain

Sri Lanka

Sudan

Suriname

Sweden

Switzerland

Syria

Taiwan

Tajikistan
Gurminj Museum of Musical Instruments
Historical Museum of Sughd
Tajikistan National Museum

Tanzania

Thailand

Togo

Tonga

Trinidad and Tobago

Tunisia

Turkey

Turkmenistan
Ashgabat National Museum of History
The main museum of Turkmenistan
Turkmen Carpet Museum
Turkmen Museum of Fine Arts

Uganda

Ukraine

United Arab Emirates

United Kingdom

United States

Uruguay

Uzbekistan

Amir Timur Museum
Bukhara State Architectural Art Museum-Preserve
Nukus Museum of Art
Ulugh Beg Observatory
State Museum of History of Uzbekistan

Vanuatu
National Museum of Vanuatu
Vanuatu Cultural Centre

Venezuela

Vietnam

Yemen

Zambia

Zimbabwe

See also

 List of buildings and structures
 Lists of tourist attractions
 Virtual Library museums pages

References

External links
 

Lists by country
Country
Museums